Manso Nkwanta is a small town and is the capital of Amansie West, a district in the Ashanti Region of Ghana.

References

External links
 Traditional Council Official Site

Populated places in the Ashanti Region